Spectrum is a five-storey modern office building in Bristol, United Kingdom. The building began construction in 1982 and was completed in 1984. It was designed by BGP Group Architects. The building is in close proximity to Cabot Circus.

Companies occupying offices in the building include Civica and Bupa Healthcare.

References 

Buildings and structures in Bristol
Office buildings completed in 1984
Modern architecture in the United Kingdom